Les "Socco" Henderson was a professional baseball pitcher in the Negro leagues. He played with the Memphis Red Sox in 1944.

References

External links
 and Seamheads

Memphis Red Sox players
Year of birth missing
Year of death missing
Baseball pitchers